Bombs, Brits and Cheerleaders is a 'fly on the wall' documentary that looks at the arrival of an American family in a UK RAF airbase.

It follows Roy, Susan and Amber Yakkel and their struggle to embrace English culture in Suffolk. Over the course of the show the troubles the family have in settling into life in England are documented, including the hostility that the locals show towards the Americans in their village.

It is currently being shown on Sky3 and is repeated several times during the week.

This is the story about a family from Oklahoma who have been stationed on the UK’s largest RAF airbase, ‘Lakenheath’, home to the F15 fighter jet and 5,000 US citizens.
Ron is a lieutenant colonel in the Air Force and is in charge of logistics and personnel for Africa operations. He thought about retiring and joining the Peace Corps until he was ordered to go to England.

The programme observes how the family copes with life outside of the wire-circled frontier away from the sugar-coated, ideal American life with its Burger King, US currency, movie theatre and rod and gun club.

Ron is happy to soak up the novelties of living in the English countryside but his life is not that affected by the change as he spends most of his day on the reassuring airbase. It is Susan, his wife, and Amber, his teenage daughter that really have to face the challenges of fitting in. This proves to be particularly hard as the locals show hostility to the very presence of the Americans in the village.

Amber attends the local school where rebellious teenagers refuse to sing the ‘Stars and Stripes’, not forgetting Mr Dawson, the eccentric psychology teacher, with his CND posters and lessons on the decline of religious doctrine. Thankfully Susan and Amber find comfort back at the airbase’s local cheerleader group but a trip to Blackpool soon shakes their confidence.

‘Bombs, Brits and Cheerleaders’ is an entertaining analysis of how an American family struggle to embrace the English culture.

External links
Information on the makers website
A short preview of the show

British reality television series